Zoltán Szaniszló (20 August 1910 – 10 October 1959) was a footballer who played international football for both Hungary and Romania. He played as a midfielder for Hungária, AMEF Arad and Ferar Cluj.

References

1910 births
1959 deaths
Hungarian footballers
Hungary international footballers
Romanian footballers
Romania international footballers
Dual internationalists (football)
MTK Budapest FC players
Vagonul Arad players
Association football midfielders